Bob Daniels may refer to:

 Bob Daniels (basketball), American basketball coach
 Bob Daniels (ice hockey) (born 1959), American ice hockey coach

See also
Robert Daniels (disambiguation)